Star Suvarna is an Indian Kannada language general entertainment pay television channel owned by The Walt Disney Company india. a wholly owned by The Walt Disney Company. its primarily telecast Kannada language programmes such as drama, reality shows.

History
It was launched on 17 June 2007 by Jupiter Entertainment Venture (JEV) as Asianet Suvarna owned by Asianet Communications Limited.

Star Suvarna is also the first channel in India to give importance to Tulu language programming during the year 2010 despite the channel being known for Kannada language programming.

In 2013, Star India acquired Asianet Communications excluding the news channels from their parent company. On 25 July 2016, the channel was rebranded as Star Suvarna along with its sister channel Star Suvarna Plus. Star Suvarna Plus was launched on 14 August 2013.

Star Survana launched its own high-definition simulcast on 15 July 2017. It offers HD visuals and Dolby Digital Plus 5.1 sound quality.

Current broadcasts

Original serials

Reality shows

Dubbed serials

Former broadcasts

Drama
Akashadeepa (2012-2014) 
Akashadeepa (2021-2022)
Ambari (2014-2015)
Amma (2016-2017)
Amrutha Varshini (2012-2017)
Amrutha Varshini (2018-2019)
Anna Thangi (2011-2012)
Anthahapura (2015)
Anuroopa (2014-2016)
Aramane Gili (2019-2020)
Aragini (2013-2015)
Ardhangi (2022)
Arthigobba Keerthigobba (2019-2020)
Avalakki Pavalakki (2009-2010)
Avanu Matte Shravani (2014-2017)
Bayasade Bali Bande (2019-2020)
Beedige Biddavaru (2010) 
Bettada Hoo (2022-2023)
Bhagyavantharu (2012)
Bili Hendthi (2018-2019)
Bombeyatavayya (2010-2011)
Cheluvi (2012-2013)
Chukki (2012-2013) 
Classmates (2010-2012)
Durga (2015-2017)
Ellaranthalla Namma Raaji (2010) 
Eradu Kanasu (2017-2018)
Geethanjali (2016-2017)
Gothanaga Porthaand (2010-2011) (First Tulu language serial of the channel)
Gundyan Hendthi (2016)
Guru Raghavendra Vaibhava (2010-2012)
Hara Hara Mahadeva (2016-2018)
Hushaar Karnataka (2016)
Idhre Irabeku Ninahanga (2009-2010) 
Inthi Nimma Asha (2019-2022)
Janaki Raghava (2017-2018)
Jeevana Chaitra (2016)
Jeeva Hoovagide (2020-2022)
Just Math Mathalli (2016-2017)
Karanji (2014)
Karpoorada Gombe (2013-2014)
Keladi Chennamma (2012)
Krishna Rukmini (2011-2013)
Krishna Tulasi (2018-2019)
Kurukshetra (2008)
Kushi (2015)
Lakumi (2010-2012)
Madhubala (2014-2015)
Maharani (2018-2019)
Manasaputhri (2008)
Marali Bandhalu Seethe (2019-2020)
Marali Manasagide (2021-2023)
Matte Vasanta (2020-2022)
Meera Madhava (2013-2014)
Meghamandara (2008-2009)
Milana (2013-2016)
Mounaraaga (2018-2019)
Nan Hendthi MBBS (2019)
Naga Panchami (2012)
Neeli (2016-2018)
Niharika (2016-2017)
Nirbhaya (2015)
Parijatha (2009)
Paarijatha (2011-2012)
Parineetha (2014)
Paduvarahalli Paddegalu (2011-2012)
Pallavi Anupallavi (2012-2014)
Pancharangi Pom Pom (2012-2015)
Preethiyinda (2011-2013)
Preethi Endarenu (2015)
Premaloka (2019-2020)
Priyadarshini (2013-2014)
Puttumalli (2017-2018)
Raaji (2022)
Radhe Shyama (2021-2022)
Rukku (2021)
Sagutha Doora Doora (2009)
Sangarsha (2020-2022)
Sangolli Rayanna (2007-2008)
Sarasu (2020-2021)
Saraswati (2013-2014)
Sarvamangala Mangalye (2018-2020)
Sathyam Shivam Sundharam (2017-2020)
Shivaleelamrutha (2008-2009)
Shrimathi Bhagyalakshmi (2015)
Shree (2018)
Shruthi Seridhaga (2019-2020)
Sindhoora (2010-2011)
Sindhoora (2017-2020)
Singari Bangari (2014)
SSLC Nan Maklu (2008-2010)
Swathi Muthu (2014)
Tirupathi Tirumala Venkatesha (2012)
Triveni Sangama (2017)
Varalakshmi Stores (2019-2020)
Yajamaani (2019-2020)

Reality shows
Action Star
Anandavani
Arogya
Bengaluru Benne Dose
Bharjari Comedy
Bhavya Brahmanda
Bombat Bhojana (Season 1)
Bigg Boss Kannada (Season 2)
Bombat Breakfast
Cookku with Kirikku
Comedy Cafe
Connexion
Dance Dance (Season 1–2)
Dr.Raj Abhimani Devaru
Gaana Bajaana (Season 1,2)
Garam Masala
Halli Hyda Pyateg Banda
Hosa LUV Story
Ismart Jodi
Jagave Vismaya
Kannadada Kotyadhipati (Season 1–3)
Kathe alla Jeevana
Kitchen Darbar
Kitchen Khiladigalu
Life Ishte Ne
Little Star Singer
Maharshi Darpana
Maja with Sruja
Mane Aduge
Mathu Kathe Vinay Jothe
Morning with Murali
Music Na Superstar
Nadediddenu
Nanna Haadu Nannadu
Neena Naana
Neevu Bhale Khilladi
No.1 Yaari
Nodi Swami Navirode Heege
Paaka Shaale
Putani Pantru
Putani Varthe
Pyate Hudgir Halli Life (Season 1–4)
Pyate Mandi Kadige Bandru
Samartha Sadguru
Sathya Nithya
Shhh
Shreekara
Simpallagi English
Sixth Sense Kannada
Star Singer
Super Jodi
Super Star of Karnataka
Super Twins
Suvarna Cinevara
Suvarna Ladies Club
Suvarna Paaka Shaale
Suvarna Superstar (Season 1)
Swalpa Adjust Madkoli
Swayamwara
Sye to Dance
Tarle Nan Maklu

Dubbed shows

Sister channels

References

External links
Official website
Online programs

Television stations in Bangalore
Kannada-language television channels
Disney Star
Television channels and stations established in 2007
2007 establishments in Karnataka